George Mungwa (died 10 March 2002) was a Zambian football coach.

Career
He served as national team manager in 1996–1997, 1998, and 2000, and also served as head of the Zambia Football Coaches Association.

References

Date of birth missing
2002 deaths
Zambian football managers
Zambia national football team managers